Aall is a prominent Norwegian family, originally from Aal in Jutland (Denmark). The family's oldest known ancestor is Søren Nielsen, who was a peasant in Aal until 1534, when he lost his farm. The family immigrated to Norway in 1714 with Niels Aall the older, who became a merchant and ship-owner in Porsgrunn. The family was part of the Patriciate of Norway from the 18th century.

Notable members
 Nicolai Benjamin Aall (1739–1798), merchant and shipowner
 Jørgen Aall (1771–1833), merchant and member of the Eidsvoll assembly
 Niels Aall (1769–1854), cabinet minister
 Jacob Aall (1773–1844), politician and historian
 Hans J. C. Aall, politician

Literature
 Haagen Krog Steffens, Slægten Aall, Kristiania 1908, med senere tilleggsbind
 Hans Cappelen, Norske slektsvåpen (Norwegian Family Coats of Arms), Oslo 1969 (2. ed 1976), p. 51
 Herman Leopoldus Løvenskiold: «Heraldisk nøkkel», Oslo 1978

Norwegian families
Patriciate of Norway